Hill Miri (exonym)  are a native tribe of Arunachal Pradesh in Northeast India. They are spread in Upper Subansiri and Kamle districts.

The term "Hill Miri" was given by the British Administration to distinguish between the “Plain Miri” of Assam and the “Nyishi” of Arunachal Pradesh. They speak a Tibeto-Burman language, but the exact origin of their language is disputed.

The festival celebrated with enormous pomp and gaiety is BooriBoot-yullo, on 6 February. The rituals of these festivals are carried out by the community priests (nyub/nyubu) which include chanting of hymns and sacrificing animals viz. mithun (sobe/sebe), goat, chicken (pork), pig (irri) etc., and serving of local brew (opo) to attendees.

The traditional attire of men includes lenin, cloth wrapped over the body covering the upper portion of the body up to the knees, and headgear includes a cap (bopar/bopa/bopia) made of cane which has a strap of bearskin attached anteriorly (sometimes with a hornbill beak at the top). The man carries a machete (orok/oriok) and a knife (rwchik/rwuchuk) shoved inside a bamboo sheath wrapped with animal furs. The women's clothing includes a blouse and a long cloth (gale) wrapped around the waist with a beautiful piece of art knitted on it.

The tribe are agriculturalist and primarily grow crops such as dagam (rice), temi (millet), mekung (cucumber), takie (ginger) and a host of green leafy vegetables. Jhum cultivation was dominant among the tribe but over the course of time have started adopting WRC gradually. They grow millet especially to prepare a local brew (opo), also made from the rice, which is very popular among members of the community and other tribes as well. The brew is served in plenty on occasions like festivals, marriages, and parties.

References 

Upper Subansiri district
Lower Subansiri district